John Brenden Law was an American football player, coach of football and baseball, and college athletics administrator. He was the third head football coach at Manhattan College and he held that position for two seasons, from 1930 until 1931. His career coaching record at Manhattan was 8–5–2. This ranks him fourth at Manhattan in total wins and first at Manhattan in winning percentage.

A native of Yonkers, New York, Law played college football at the University of Notre Dame and was captain of the undefeated 1929 Notre Dame Fighting Irish football team. After coaching at Manhattan he became the football and baseball coach at Sing Sing prison from 1932 to 1935.

Head coaching record

Football

References

Year of birth missing
Year of death missing
American football guards
Manhattan Jaspers football coaches
Mount St. Mary's Mountaineers athletic directors
Mount St. Mary's Mountaineers baseball coaches
Mount St. Mary's Mountaineers football coaches
Notre Dame Fighting Irish football players
Sportspeople from Yonkers, New York
Coaches of American football from New York (state)
Players of American football from New York (state)